Canadian rock band, Simple Plan, formed in 1999, has released six studio albums, two live albums, one video album, three extended plays and twenty singles.

In 2002, they released their first album No Pads, No Helmets...Just Balls, which soon became a moderate commercial success and was certified multi-platinum in Canada and the United States and platinum in Australia. Of the four singles released, "Perfect" was the most successful, reaching the fifth position on the Canadian Hot 100, the sixth on the ARIA Singles Chart and the twenty-fourth on the Billboard Hot 100. In 2003, they released their first and so far only video album A Big Package for You and the live album Live in Japan 2002, which was released only in Canada and Japan in 2003. In 2004, they released the EP Live in Anaheim and their second studio album Still Not Getting Any.... The album outsold its predecessor in all countries except the US. The album spawned five singles: "Welcome to My Life" in 2004, "Shut Up!", "Untitled" and "Crazy" in 2005 and "Perfect World" in 2006. The first became the band's biggest hit, reaching the top ten in several countries.

MTV Hard Rock Live was released in 2005 and was the group's last release for close to three years, until their self-titled third studio album was released in 2008; it was later certified platinum in Canada. In 2009, the band released their second EP, iTunes Live from Montreal. The album Get Your Heart On! followed in 2011 and spawned four singles: "Can't Keep My Hands off You", "Jet Lag", "Astronaut" and "Summer Paradise".

As of 2022, Simple Plan has moved 5.1 million album units and 700 million on demand streams of their songs in the United States alone.

Albums

Studio albums

Live albums

Extended plays

Singles

Promotional singles

Other charted songs

Videography

Video albums

Music videos

Notes

References

Simple Plan
Pop punk group discographies
Discography